Peperomia prostrata is a species of plant in the genus Peperomia. It is endemic to Ecuador. It is sometimes called string of turtles.

References

prostrata
Flora of Ecuador